Yegor Chernyshov may refer to:
 Yegor Chernyshov (footballer, born 1997), Russian football defender for FC Tom Tomsk
 Yegor Chernyshov (footballer, born 1998), Russian football midfielder for Ocean Kerch